Visakh Subramaniam is an Indian film producer, distributor and exhibitor who works in the Malayalam film industry. He is the grandson of P. Subramaniam who founded Merryland Studio, the second film studio in Kerala. He  is a partner of the production company Funtastic Films along with actors Aju Varghese and Dhyan Sreenivasan.  Visakh began his career as a film producer in 2019 with Love Action Drama directed by Dhyan Sreenivasan and starring Nivin Pauly and Nayanthara. The film grossed ₹50 crore (US$7.2 million) at the box office and completed 100 days in Kerala. He produced the Vineeth Sreenivasan directorial Hridayam starring Pranav Mohanlal and Kalyani Priyadarshan under his banner Merryland Cinemas.

Career
Visakh made his entry as a film exhibitor in 2011, the same time when Vineeth Sreenivasan, Aju Varghese and Dhyan Sreenivasan made their debuts. He started to manage the theaters Sree Kumar, Sree Visakh and New situated in Thiruvananthapuram, which were formerly owned by his father S. Murugan. While screening films like Salt N' Pepper, 22 Female Kottayam, Diamond Necklace and Thattathin Marayathu in his own theater, he felt that they were bringing in new filmmakers with fresh thoughts and ideas. It was during that time he first met Vineeth Sreenivasan and Aju Varghese who were part of Thattathin Marayathu (2012). With time he also met Dhyan Sreenivasan and their bond strengthened leading to collaboration plans.    

On the release day of Vineeth's directorial Jacobinte Swargarajyam (2016), Dhyan narrated the script of Love Action Drama to Visakh. Aju Varghese was the film's sole producer then. Later Dhyan asked Visakh if he was interested in producing the film along with Aju, upon which he agreed. It was then Funtastic Films was formed and Visakh considers it as the boldest decision of his life. His debut production Love Action Drama starring Nivin Pauly and Nayanthara released on 5 September 2019 and opened to positive reports. The film grossed ₹50 crore (US$7.2 million) at the box office and completed 100 days in Kerala. He then ventured into film distribution and distributed Helen under his banner Funtastic Films. In 2020, he was involved in the distribution of Gauthamante Radham starring Neeraj Madhav. In 2021, he produced Saajan Bakery Since 1962 starring Aju Varghese and currently is producing Hridayam starring Pranav Mohanlal and Kalyani Priyadarshan. Hridayam directed by Vineeth Sreenivasan also marks the return of Merryland Studio through Visakh. The studio founded by his grandfather P. Subramaniam makes a comeback after a hiatus of 40 years. During the COVID-19 pandemic lockdown in India, Visakh also produced a part of the comedy series Mom and Son featuring YouTuber Kaarthik Sankar and Aju Varghese on YouTube.

Filmography

References

External links
 
 

Malayali people
Malayalam film producers
Film producers from Kerala
Businesspeople from Thiruvananthapuram
Businesspeople from Kerala
Film producers from Thiruvananthapuram
21st-century Indian businesspeople
1988 births
Living people